Siebnen-Wangen railway station is a railway station in the Swiss canton of Schwyz and municipality of Wangen. The station is located on the Lake Zurich left-bank railway line, owned by the Swiss Federal Railways (SBB), and takes its name from Wangen and the adjacent village of Siebnen.

Layout and connections 
Siebnen-Wangen has a  island platform with two tracks ( 3–4). PostAuto Schweiz operates bus services from the station to Innerthal, Uznach, Reichenburg, and Pfäffikon.

Services 
 the following services stop at Siebnen-Wangen:

 Zürich S-Bahn:

References

External links
 
 

Railway stations in the canton of Schwyz
Swiss Federal Railways stations